The Creation, the oratorio by Joseph Haydn, is structured in three parts. He composed it in 1796–1798 on German text as Die Schöpfung. The work is set for soloists, chorus and orchestra. Its movements are listed in tables for their form,  voice, key, tempo marking, time signature and source.

Libretto 

The origin of the libretto is not known. Haydn received the booklet in English in London on his second extended stay in 1795 from his impresario Johann Peter Salomon. According to Haydn, it was passed by a certain Lidley, or perhaps Thomas Linley, and was attributed to him, but may be written by an unknown author. Back in Vienna, Haydn passed it to his friend and sponsor Baron Gottfried van Swieten, who translated and organized it.

The sources for the libretto are the two Creation narratives from the Book of Genesis, some Psalms, and John Milton's Paradise Lost, an epic poem in ten volumes, first published in 1667. The libretto is structured in three parts, the first dealing with the Creation of the universe and the plants, the second with the Creation of the animals, and of man and woman, and the third with Adam and Eve in Paradise, showing an idealized love in harmony with the "new world".

Music 

Haydn had composed symphonies, operas, string quartets and more chamber music for the court at Eszterháza. For the oratorio he used the vocal means of contemporary opera, recitative, aria, ensemble and chorus. The orchestra plays a decisive role in structure and tone painting.

The oratorio has five solo roles, in Part I and II the three archangels Gabriel (soprano), Uriel (tenor) and Raphael (bass), in Part III Adam (bass) and Eve (soprano). The final movement needs an additional alto soloist. The chorus is in four parts, SATB. Haydn used three soloists, some conductors prefer different soloists for Adam and Eve.

Haydn set most of the narration from the Genesis in secco recitative. The rendering of the words is simple, different for example from Bach's approach in the parts of the Evangelist in his Passions. Haydn exceptions are the two recitatives opening Part I and II, which are accompanied by the orchestra. For each day, the recitative is followed by a contemplation of it, typically in accompanied recitative and aria, and affirmed by a choral movement.

As Bach in his Christmas Oratorio and Handel in Messiah, Haydn saves the soprano voice for a late appearance. Whereas Bach and Handel reserve the high voice for the Annunciation to the shepherds, Haydn has Gabriel be the first to proclaim the wonder of the Wunderwerk (miraculous work).

Differently from Handel, who keeps solo and choral singing mostly separate in his operas and oratorios, Haydn strives for an interaction of solo and chorus, as in his late Masses and contemporary opera. In the conclusion of Part I, Die Himmel erzählen die Ehre Gottes (The heavens are telling the glory of God), which covers the first two verses of Psalm 19, the second verse, "To day that is coming speaks it the day ...", is given to the soloists, who sing to each other. This trio section is repeated, leading to a choral repetition of verse 1, the second time a bit faster (Più allegro) and concluded by an elaborate fugue, crafted on its second part, "and the firmament sheweth his handywork". In Vollendet ist das große Werk, the chorus frames a slow trio section by two different fast movements. In Von deiner Güt, o Herr und Gott (By thy goodness, O bounteous Lord), the soloists sing a duet, accompanied by triplets, while the choir with the timpani sings simultaneously, as a soft foundation in even rhythm speaking of eternity, Gesegnet sei des Herren Macht (Forever blessed be his pow'r).

The orchestra plays a distinct role in word painting. For example, flute and clarinet imitate the singing of the birds, trombones and contrabassoon articulate the roaring of the lion. When God speaks in person, "Seid fruchtbar" (be fruitful), the bass voice is accompanied by the low strings only. The solemn sound is reminiscent of the string quartet accompanying the Vox Christi (voice of Christ) in Bach's St Matthew Passion. The cellos have the melody speaking of human love, three flutes illustrate Paradise.

Richard Wigmore summarizes: "In our own sceptical and precarious age we can still delight, perhaps with a touch of nostalgia, in Haydn’s unsullied optimism, expressed in some of the most lovable and life-affirming music ever composed."

General notes 

The following tables are organized by a number and first line of the movements. Different numbering of the movement exists. The voices are sometimes abbreviated S for soprano, T for tenor, B for bass. The modulating keys of many recitatives are written in accidentals. Recitatives typically come without a tempo marking. If no source is given, the text is derived from Paradise Lost. The book of Genesis is abbreviated "Gen", the Book of Psalms "Ps". The English translations are taken from the edition of the Oxford University Press, 1991.

Part I

Part II

Part III

Notes

Sources 

 
 Die Schöpfung Libretto stanford.edu

References

External links 
 Haydn Die Schöpfung (The Creation) liner notes for Colin Davis
 Haydn The Creation liner notes for René Jacobs
 Die Schöpfung in 7 Tagen libretto, history, analysis 

Oratorios by Joseph Haydn
Christian music lists